Thomas Wolter (born 4 October 1963) is a German former professional footballer who played as a midfielder or a defender, and the current manager of SV Werder Bremen's youth academy.

Club career
Born in Hamburg, Wolter arrived at SV Werder Bremen in the summer of 1984, from local amateurs Hamburg Eimsbütteler Ballspiel Club. After only three games in his first season in the Bundesliga he became first-choice, and remained his entire professional career with the same club.

Due to injury, Wolter was only able to appear in 16 matches in the 1987–88 campaign as the Hanseatic League team won the second national championship in its history, the first in 23 years. He also appeared in four German Cup finals in the late 80s/early 90s, winning two and losing two.

Wolter played in 34 official contests in 1991–92 – this included six in the season's UEFA Cup Winners' Cup which ended in conquest, with the player being stretchered off in the first half of the 2–0 final win against Monaco. He retired in June 1998 at almost 35 years of age, with nearly 400 official games – 312 in the (West) German top-flight - to his credit.

In the molds of another Werder legend, Thomas Schaaf, Wolter continued his career at the club as a manager, starting in the reserve team. In July 2013 he was appointed at the youth academy, while Viktor Skrypnyk replaced him at the reserves.

International career
Wolter gained one cap for Germany, playing 60 minutes in a 3–1 friendly loss with Brazil in Porto Alegre, on 16 December 1992.

Honours
Werder Bremen
Bundesliga: 1987–88, 1992–93
DFB-Pokal: 1990–91, 1993–94; runners-up 1988–89, 1989–90
DFL-Supercup: 1988, 1993, 1994; runners-up 1991
UEFA Cup Winners' Cup: 1991–92

See also
List of one-club men

References

External links
 
 
 

1963 births
Living people
Footballers from Hamburg
German footballers
Association football defenders
Association football midfielders
Bundesliga players
SV Werder Bremen players
SV Werder Bremen II players
Germany international footballers
German football managers
3. Liga managers
SV Werder Bremen II managers
SV Werder Bremen non-playing staff
West German footballers
HEBC Hamburg players